Acapulco is a city and major sea port in the state of Guerrero on the Pacific coast of Mexico.

Acapulco may refer to:

Geography
 Acapulco, Peru, a town in the Zorritos District of the Contralmirante Villar Province, in the Tumbes Region of Peru
 Acapulco (municipality), Mexico
 Sounine plage, a beach nicknamed 'Acapulco' adjoining the village of Sounine, Tunisia
 Acapulco Mexican Restaurant and Cantina, a restaurant chain in California and Oregon

Plants
 The local Philippines name for Senna alata (= Cassia alata)

Film and television
 Acapulco (film), a 1952 Mexican film
 Acapulco (1961 TV series), a television series on NBC
 Acapulco (2021 TV series), a Spanish and English-language comedy television series

Astronomy
 Acapulco, a 1976 meteorite fall in Mexico
 6349 Acapulco, an asteroid

Music
 Acapulco (album), an album by Swedish singer Therese Grankvist
 "Acapulco" (song), 2021 song by Jason Derulo
 "Acapulco", a 1988 song by Die Flippers
 Acapulco (nightclub), a nightclub in Halifax, Yorkshire, England